Thomas George Dimitroff (June 6, 1935 – January 20, 1996) was an American gridiron football player and coach.

Playing career
Dimitroff was a two-time All-Mid-American Conference quarterback and defensive back at Miami University in Oxford, Ohio. He passed for 1,096 yards and 11 touchdowns, and ran for 542 yards. As a kicker, he converted on 22 extra-point attempts and had a punting average of 36.2 yards. He played on two MAC championship football teams under Ara Parseghian and John Pont. He was selected by the Cleveland Browns in the 25th round of the 1957 Draft, but instead signed with the Ottawa Rough Riders Interprovincial Rugby Football Union. On August 23, 1958, Dimitroff started for Ottawa in the first regular-season game in Canadian Football League history. In May 1959, Dimitroff was traded along with Larry Hayes, Jim Marshall, Frank Fraser, and Karl Hilzinger to the Saskatchewan Roughriders for quarterback Frank Tripucka. Dimitroff retired shortly after the trade, never playing a game for Saskatchewan.

In 1960, Dimitroff came out of retirement to play for the newly formed American Football League (AFL). He signed with the New York Titans, but did not appear in any games for them. He later signed with the Boston Patriots and appeared in three games, throwing two incomplete passes.

Coaching career
After serving as an assistant coach at Barberton High School and Wadsworth High School, Dimitroff returned to Miami, where he was an assistant from 1969 to 1972. After one season at Kansas State, Dimitroff joined former Rough Rider teammate George Brancato in Ottawa. From 1974 to 1977, he served as the Ottawa Rough Riders quarterbacks coach and offensive coordinator, helping coach Ottawa to victory in the 1976 Grey Cup, the final Grey Cup victory in Rough Riders history.

In 1978, he became the head coach of the Hamilton Tiger-Cats. He was fired after five games and replaced by John Payne. Following his departure from Hamilton, Dimitroff coached the Guelph Gryphons football team, where his son Randy was quarterback from 1982 to 1985.

Dimitroff left coaching in 1984 to serve as Director of Player Personnel for the Ottawa Rough Riders. In 1986, he was named the team's interim head coach after the firing of Joe Moss. The Rough Riders were 0–4–1 under Dimitroff and in 1987 he joined the Cleveland Browns as a college scout.

Family and death
He was the father of former Atlanta Falcons general manager Thomas Dimitroff. Dimitroff died on January 20, 1996, in Strongsville, Ohio.

See also
 List of American Football League players

References

1935 births
1996 deaths
American football quarterbacks
American Football League players
Boston Patriots players
Cleveland Browns scouts
Hamilton Tiger-Cats coaches
Kansas State Wildcats football coaches
Miami RedHawks football coaches
Miami RedHawks football players
New York Titans (AFL) players
Ottawa Rough Riders coaches
Ottawa Rough Riders players
High school football coaches in Ohio
People from Strongsville, Ohio
People from Barberton, Ohio